The United Reformed Church, Muswell Hill, London, is located on the corner of Tetherdown and Queens Avenue.

References

External links

Muswell Hill
Churches in the London Borough of Haringey
United Reformed churches in London